Douglasdale is a residential neighbourhood in the southeast quadrant of Calgary, Alberta. It is bounded by 114 Avenue S to the north, 130 Avenue S to the south, Deerfoot Trail to the east and the Bow River to the west. The Fish Creek Provincial Park borders the neighbourhood to the west. Douglasglen is located in the northern area, north of Deerfoot Trail.

The community was established in 1986. It is represented in the Calgary City Council by the Ward 12 councillor.

Demographics

Residents in this community had a median household income of $85,350 in 2000, and there were 2.4% low income residents living in the neighbourhood. As of 2000, 15.2% of the residents were immigrants. All buildings were single-family detached homes, and 1.7% of the housing was used for renting.

Education
This neighbourhood has one public elementary school: Douglasdale Elementary School. (K-4, plus a program for Autistic learners) It also has a public Catholic elementary/junior high school: Monsignor J. S. Smith School (K-9)

See also
List of neighbourhoods in Calgary

References

External links
Douglasdale Community Information

Neighbourhoods in Calgary